Louisiana's 17th State Senate district is one of 39 districts in the Louisiana State Senate. It was represented by Democrat-turned-Republican Rick Ward III from 2012 until his resignation in June 2022.

Geography
District 17 spans Acadiana and the Florida Parishes, including all of East Feliciana and Pointe Coupee Parishes and parts of Assumption, East Baton Rouge, Iberville, St. Helena, St. Martin, West Baton Rouge, and West Feliciana Parishes. Towns in the district include Greensburg, Clinton, Jackson, New Roads, Plaquemine, White Castle, and Pierre Part.

The district overlaps with Louisiana's 2nd, 3rd, 5th, and 6th congressional districts, and with the 18th, 29th, 50th, 51st, 58th, 60th, 62nd, 64th, and 72nd districts of the Louisiana House of Representatives.

Recent election results
Louisiana uses a jungle primary system. If no candidate receives 50% in the first round of voting, when all candidates appear on the same ballot regardless of party, the top-two finishers advance to a runoff election.

2019

2015

2011

Federal and statewide results in District 17

References

Louisiana State Senate districts
Assumption Parish, Louisiana
East Baton Rouge Parish, Louisiana
East Feliciana Parish, Louisiana
Iberville Parish, Louisiana
Pointe Coupee Parish, Louisiana
St. Helena Parish, Louisiana
St. Martin Parish, Louisiana
West Baton Rouge Parish, Louisiana
West Feliciana Parish, Louisiana